Antilochus was the son of Nestor, king of Pylos, in Greek mythology.

Antilochus may also refer to:
 Antilochus (bug), a genus of true bug in the family Pyrrhocoridae
 Antilochus (historian), Ancient Greek historian
 1583 Antilochus, an asteroid